John Ardagh (28 May 1928, Nyasaland – 26 January 2008, London) was a British journalist, writer and broadcaster. He was educated at Sherborne School, Dorset, and Worcester College, Oxford, where he took a degree in classics and philosophy. 1953 until 1959 he worked for The Times as a staff writer and correspondent in France and Algeria. His interest in provincial themes developed through work for Independent Television News, and as a correspondent for The Observer (1960–66), writing mostly about culture. His book The New French Revolution, first published in 1968, has been updated many times, most recently as France in the New Century: Portrait of a Changing Society (1999) Ardagh wrote other books to reflect "real" life in Europe. Tale of Five Cities, based on major provincial centers of Europe, appeared in 1979. Germany and the Germans he wrote 1987 together with his German wife Katharina. Ireland and the Irish (1994) drew on his own family roots. He was also managing editor of the Good Food Guide from 1966 to 1968, and European editor of the Good Hotel Guide for 25 years. Ardagh continued to work for better cross-Channel understanding as a member of the Franco-British Council (1992–98). There his name is associated with a study of publishing in France and Britain (1995), produced with the French historian, François Crouzet. He was made a Chevalier des Arts et des Lettres by the French Government.

His explorer roots went back to his childhood. His father Osmond Ardagh was a colonial administrator and played first-class cricket for Oxford University. His mother was Austrian. He was married four times, showing his “cosmopolitan streak in his choice of wives: English, Czech (rescued from the Prague Spring of 1968), Australian and German”(Katharina, born Schmitz, *1951 in Berlin). His son from the first marriage is the author and speaker (Nicholas) Arjuna Ardagh.

Books authored
  (and previous editions)
  (and previous editions)

References

External links
Obituary in The Times, January 30, 2008
Obituary in The Slovenia Times, February 22, 2008

1928 births
2008 deaths
English male journalists
The Times people
English male non-fiction writers